List of representatives and senators of the Arizona Legislature by legislative districts after the 2010 redistricting.

For a current list see List of representatives and senators of Arizona Legislature by districts (2023–2033)

Background 
Redistricting in Arizona occurs every 10 years and is conducted by the Arizona Independent Redistricting Commission. In 2010 the commission held 58 business meetings and 43 public hearings in locations all over the state, for a total of over 359 hours in an 11-month period. There were a total of over 5,000 attendees at those meetings, and 2,350 speaking requests were granted. The commission streamed almost every meeting to the internet, allowing another 1,850 distinct viewers to join. After these meetings the AIRC submitted the final Legislative Maps to the Department of Justice on February 28, 2012 for preclearance under the Voting Rights Act. The Justice Department approved the maps on April 26, 2012. The Supreme Court upheld the 2010 redistricting in Harris v. Arizona Independent Redistricting Commission. The first election using the newly drawn districts occurred on November 6, 2012.

A district map can be found on google.

Arizona – by legislature

Senate leadership

House leadership

Arizona – by district 
† Member was appointed.

Arizona – 1st district – Prescott – Yavapai County – New River

Arizona – 2nd district – Green Valley – Tucson South East

Arizona – 3rd district – Tucson West – Three Points

Arizona – 4th district – Maricopa County SouthWest – Yuma

Arizona – 5th district – Mohave County – La Paz County

Arizona – 6th district – Flagstaff – Coconino County

Arizona – 7th district  – Apache County – Navajo County

Arizona – 8th district  – Pinal County – San Tan Valley

Arizona – 9th district  – Tucson North

Arizona – 10th district – Pima County East – Tanque Verde

Arizona – 11th district  – Maricopa – Oro Valley

Arizona – 12th district  – Gilbert–Queen Creek

Arizona – 13th district  – Maricopa County South-West – Yuma County

Arizona – 14th district  – Cochise County – Greenlee County

Arizona – 15th district  – Phoenix North-East – Deer Valley

Arizona – 16th district  – Apache Junction – Mesa East

Arizona – 17th district  – Chandler – Sun Lakes

Arizona – 18th district  – Mesa South-West – Ahwatukee

Arizona – 19th district  – Avondale – Tolleson

Arizona – 20th district  – Phoenix North-West – Moon Valley

Arizona – 21st district – El Mirage – Peoria – Sun City

Arizona – 22nd district – Surprise – Maricopa County North-Central

Arizona – 23rd district – Fountain Hills – Scottsdale

Arizona – 24th district – Phoenix East – Scottsdale South

Arizona – 25th district – Mesa

Arizona – 26th district – Tempe – Mesa

Arizona – 27th district – Phoenix Downtown – Laveen – Guadalupe

Arizona – 28th district – Phoenix East – Paradise Valley

Arizona – 29th district – Glendale – Maryvale

Arizona – 30th district – Glendale – Phoenix West

See also 
 List of representatives and senators of Arizona Legislature by districts (2003–2013)
 List of Arizona legislative districts

Notes

References 

 
State Legislature